The 1978 Cleveland Browns season was the team's 29th season with the National Football League (NFL). After nearly three years of struggling offensively – and not making the playoffs—while posting just one winning record under ultra-strict, disciplinarian head coach Forrest Gregg, the Browns in 1978 decided to take a softer approach to liven up their attack – and their team. They did so by hiring a virtually unknown assistant at the time, New Orleans Saints receivers coach Sam Rutigliano, to replace Gregg, who was fired with one game left in the 1977 season. Rutigliano was the fourth head coach hired by Art Modell in his 18 years as club owner to that point, and it marked the first time Modell had not promoted from within the organization to fill the spot.

Although it took a while for things to develop, the idea of bringing in someone from the outside nonetheless worked. With Rutigliano, who was as progressive, innovative and forward-thinking of an offensive mind as there was in the game at the time, running the show, the once-stagnant Browns attack scored 30 or more points four times in eight games in the second half of that season. More importantly, Rutigliano was able to jump-start the career of embattled quarterback Brian Sipe, which would pay huge dividends for the team two years later when he won the NFL MVP award and led the Browns to the AFC Central title. He finished with 21 touchdown passes and 15 interceptions in 1978 for a quarterback rating of 80.7, by far his best numbers in his five seasons with the Browns.

The Browns started well, winning their first three games over the San Francisco 49ers (24–7), Cincinnati Bengals (13–10 in overtime) and Atlanta Falcons (24–16). They then stood 4–2 after beating the Saints 24–16 three games later.

But in the process of the Browns offense getting revved up, the defense soon started to come unglued. Yes, the Browns were scoring a lot of points in those final eight games, but they were giving up a lot, too. In fact, they surrendered 34 or more points in three successive games at the very end of the year. The end result was an 8–8 finish in which the Browns were outscored by 22 points overall, 356 to 334, in the first year that the NFL expanded from a 14- to a 16-game regular season. The Browns top draft choice that year, future Hall of Fame TE Ozzie Newsome, fresh off of an NCAA National Championship with Paul "Bear" Bryant's Alabama Crimson Tide team, had a solid rookie season, snaring 38 passes for 589 yards and two touchdowns.

Offseason

NFL draft 
The following were selected in the 1978 NFL draft.

Personnel

Staff / Coaches

Roster

Regular season

Schedule

Note: Intra-division opponents are in bold text.

Standings

Game Summaries

Week 3: at Atlanta

References

External links 
 1978 Cleveland Browns Statistics at jt-sw.com
 1978 Cleveland Browns Schedule at jt-sw.com
 1978 Cleveland Browns at DatabaseFootball.com  
 1978 Cleveland Browns at Pro-Football-Reference.com

Cleveland
Cleveland Browns seasons
Cleveland Browns